Giovanni Arioli (born 23 April 1976) is an Italian football coach and a former player who played as a midfielder.

Playing career
After playing in Parma youth teams, he made his debut in Serie A on 10 March 1996 against Piacenza and scored one goal. After that he played in many teams in Serie C1 and Serie C2.

In January 2010 he left for Pro Belvedere Vercelli and made his league debut on 13 January 2010 against Crociati Noceto.

Coaching career
On 25 May 2019, he was hired by Serie D club Villafranca. He was sacked in November 2019. He was re-appointed in the same position in February 2020. In the summer 2020, he was replaced by Paolo Corghi.

References

External links
 Profile at AIC

1976 births
Living people
Italian footballers
Association football midfielders
Sportspeople from Mantua
Serie A players
Serie C players
Serie D players
Parma Calcio 1913 players
A.S. Lodigiani players
Aurora Pro Patria 1919 players
Mantova 1911 players
F.C. Pro Vercelli 1892 players
A.C. Legnano players
F.C. Lumezzane V.G.Z. A.S.D. players
A.S.D. Calcio Ivrea players
U.S. Folgore Caratese A.S.D. players
U.S.D. Olginatese players
U.S. Darfo Boario S.S.D. players
Italian football managers
Footballers from Lombardy